The Vorontsov Palace is a 19th-century palace and colonnade in Odesa, Ukraine, at the end of the Prymorskyi Boulevard pedestrian walkway.

History
The buildings were built between 1827 and 1830 by the Sardinian-born architect Francesco Boffo for Russian Prince Mikhail Semyonovich Vorontsov, one of the governor-generals of the Odessa region. The palace was built on the site where the Turkish fortress of Hajibey used to be. Palace complex includes main building, stables, colonnade and two lions, which used to stay near the gate of a main entrance. Vorontsov was so impressed with Boffo's work, that he contracted Boffo to design the Potemkin Stairs.

In 1906 it became an engineering school. During this time, next to the former palace was Lloyd's Travel Agency where the city's elite could purchase tickets for their trips abroad.

In 1917 it was the headquarters of the Soviet Red Guards, and in March 1917 the first Soviet of Workers' and Sailors' Deputies met in the building.

In 1936 the Vorontsov Palace was acquired by the Young Pioneers, and renamed the Children's Palace.

The present day palace is only the front part of the original structure, the less valuable part of the complex, the Orlov wing was torn down. The Orlov wing was mainly apartments and outbuildings—nicknamed the "Orlovsky outhouse", it stretched from today's Mother-in-Law's Bridge.

In the second half of the 20th century, the palace had two fires. 
 
In 1994 sculptor Mikhail Reva built a fountain called "Day and Night" in the courtyard. The fountain has not had any water since 1999.

See also
 Vorontsov Palace (disambiguation), list of similarly named palaces built for the Vorontsov family

Notes

Buildings and structures in Odesa
Palaces in Ukraine
Houses completed in 1830
1830 establishments in the Russian Empire

Tourist attractions in Odesa
Neoclassical architecture in Ukraine
Buildings and structures destroyed during the 2022 Russian invasion of Ukraine